José Manuel Durán Pérez, popularly known as "Pepe Durán" (born October 9, 1945, in Madrid, Spain) is a former Spanish professional boxer. During his eleven-year professional career Duran held the Lineal and WBA light middleweight titles. He challenged for the WBC version of the title and held the EBU title. He also competed in the men's welterweight event at the 1968 Summer Olympics.

Professional career
Duran made his professional debut on November 30, 1967, in Barcelona, Spain. Duran made a victorious start to his career by scoring a knockout over Ben Hamida in the third round. After winning 22 consecutive bouts Duran suffered his first defeat, losing to Jean Josselin via an eight-round decision on June 22, 1970. Duran was able to avenge this defeat on May 21, 1971, once again the fight went the eight round distance although Duran won the decision on this occasion. Duran won his first championship on June 7, 1974, by beating Jacques Kechichian and thus winning the EBU title.

On May 7, 1975, Duran made his first attempt at winning the world title. He travelled to Monaco to fight Miguel de Oliveira for the vacant WBC Light Middleweight title. De Oliveira, a native of Brazil, won the title via a unanimous decision after a bloody battle which lasted the full fifteen rounds. In his next fight Duran lost his EBU title in Germany to Eckhard Dagge, a man Duran had previously beaten by a technical knockout in the eleventh round. On this occasion, however, it was Dagge who scored the knockout, with the fight being stopped in the ninth round.

Duran once again challenged for the world title on May 18, 1976. On this occasion Duran travelled to Tokyo, Japan to successfully challenge Koichi Wajima for the Lineal and WBA light middleweight titles. Duran started the fight well by opening a large cut on the champion's forehead and knocking him down in the second round. Wajima was knocked down once again in the thirteenth round before the fight was finally stopped in the fourteenth.

Duran lost his title in his first defence, against the Argentine challenger Miguel Angel Castellini on October 8, 1976. Duran, fighting in his home city of Madrid, was knocked down in the third round by a left hand to the jaw. Although Duran rose from the canvas, he was outworked by the faster challenger and lost his title via a split decision in a fight where both boxers finished with bloody faces.

In his final fight Duran challenged the Italian-Australian champion Rocky Mattioli for the WBC Light Middleweight title. The result was never in doubt, as Mattioli knocked Duran down in the second, fourth and early in the fifth before delivering the final knockout punch late in the fifth round.

Professional boxing record

See also
List of world light-middleweight boxing champions

References

External links

Entrevista a Durán en Diario Sur
José Durán - CBZ Profile

1945 births
Living people
Spanish male boxers
Sportspeople from Madrid
Olympic boxers of Spain
Boxers at the 1968 Summer Olympics
Mediterranean Games medalists in boxing
Competitors at the 1967 Mediterranean Games
Mediterranean Games bronze medalists for Spain
World light-middleweight boxing champions
European Boxing Union champions
World Boxing Association champions
The Ring (magazine) champions